Saraburi railway station is a railway station in the Pak Priao Sub-district, Saraburi City, Saraburi. It is a class 1 railway station  from Bangkok railway station. It was opened on May 1, 1897 as part of the Northeastern Line Ayutthaya–Kaeng Khoi Junction section.

Train services 
 Special Express No. 21/22 Bangkok–Ubon Ratchathani- Bangkok
 Express No. 67/68 Bangkok–Ubon Ratchathani–Bangkok
 Express No. 69/70 Bangkok–Nong Khai–Bangkok
 Express No. 71/72 Bangkok–Si Sa Ket–Bangkok
 Express No. 73/74 Bangkok–Sikhoraphum–Bangkok
 Express No. 75/76 Bangkok–Nong Khai–Bangkok
 Express No. 77/78 Bangkok–Nong Khai–Bangkok
 Rapid No. 133/134 Bangkok–Nong Khai–Bangkok
 Rapid No. 135/136 Bangkok–Ubon Ratchathani–Bangkok
 Rapid No. 139/140 Bangkok–Ubon Ratchathani–Bangkok
 Rapid No. 141/142 Bangkok–Ubon Ratchathani–Bangkok
 Rapid No. 145/146 Bangkok–Ubon Ratchathani–Bangkok
 Ordinary No. 233/234 Bangkok–Surin–Bangkok
 Commuter No. 339/340 Bangkok–Kaeng Khoi Junction–Bangkok (weekdays only)
 Commuter No. 341/342 Bangkok–Kaeng Khoi Junction–Bangkok (weekdays only)
 Commuter No. 343/344 Bangkok–Kaeng Khoi Junction–Bangkok (weekends only)

References 
 
 
 

Railway stations in Thailand
Railway stations opened in 1897